The Play-offs of the 2006 Fed Cup Americas Zone Group I were the final stages of the Group I Zonal Competition involving teams from the Americas. Using the positions determined in their pools, the seven teams faced off to determine their placing in the 2006 Fed Cup Americas Zone Group II. The top two teams advanced to Group II for the next year.

Promotion play-offs
The first and second placed teams of each pool were placed against each other in two head-to-head rounds. The winner of the rounds advanced to Group II for 2007.

Venezuela vs. Paraguay

Bolivia vs. Dominican Republic

Fifth to Sixth play-offs
The last-placed teams from each pool were drawn in head-to-head rounds to find the fifth and sixth placed teams.

Panama vs. Bermuda

Final Placements

  and  advanced to 2007 Fed Cup Americas Zone Group I. The Dominicans placed fourth in their pool of four, and thus were relegated back to Group II for 2008, while the Venezuelans did not to compete.

See also
Fed Cup structure

References

External links
 Fed Cup website

2006 Fed Cup Americas Zone